The Polish Air Navigation Services Agency (PANSA) started its duty in 2007 as an independent unit, after isolating from "Polish Airports". It is running as a state agency which deals with air traffic management (ATM). PANSA's main obligations and objects are:
 Airspace Management (ASM)
 Air Traffic Flow Management (AFTM)
 to provide Air Traffic Services (ATS)

The main object for the Agency is to provide the safety for air traffic in FIR Warsaw. While being in the air an aircraft is under constant surveillance of Air Traffic Controllers (ATCO). Their duty is to provide safe distance (separation) between the aircraft and in case of happening the dangerous situations - to give pilots the appropriate help.

The Agency's control activity is based on three levels:
 Area (En-route) Control
 Approach (Terminal) Control
 Tower (Airport) Control

Additionally the Agency provides also Flight Information Service (FIS) in uncontrolled airspace. It coordinates as well with Search and Rescue (SAR) providing Alerting Service (ALRS).

External links 
Home Site of Polish Air Navigation Services Agency

Air traffic control
Air navigation service providers